This is a survey of the postage stamps and postal history of Indochina.

First stamps
The postage stamps of French Indochina begin on May 16, 1886, with the overprinting of "5" or "5 C. CH." on the generic stamps of the French Colonies, for use in Cochinchina (mainly Saigon).

On January 21, 1888, stamps crudely overprinted A & T (meaning Annam & Tonkin), along with a "1" or "5", and also on the generic colonies stamps, were issued for those territories.  The example at right was cancelled at Hanoi (spelled "HA-NOI") in Tonkin, on 17 March 1888.

The 1889 unification of colonial administration first resulted in surcharges in January 1889, on the 35c French Colonies stamp, reading INDO-CHINE 89 / 5 / R D (8 January) and INDO-CHINE / 1889 / R - D (10 January), where the "R" referred to the colonial governor P. Richaud, and the "D" to the postmaster at Saigon, General P. Demars.  The example illustrated at right was cancelled at Vinh Long, a town of the Mekong Delta, on 4 April 1889, just a few months after the stamp was issued.

First regular stamps
In 1892 the first five regular stamps of Indochina were issued as part of the standard Navigation and Commerce, and inscribed INDO-CHINE. Three succeeding ones were issued in 1900, and two in 1902 - all in the same basic design with different colors.

Inscription of INDO-CHINE in the typical blank box at the bottom was replaced with printing of INDO-CHINE FRANCAISE from the definite stamps issued in 1904.

Subsequent issues included an attractive and artistic set featuring native women (1907), a surcharged set of 1919 necessitated by the changeover from centimes and francs to cents and piasters in the previous year, and a reprinted set valued in the new currency, starting with a 1/10-cent denomination.

Sets featuring local sights appeared in 1927, 1931, and in 1936 depicting cultural views like a farmer plowing the ground or constructions, Apsara, and native emperors of Annam and Cambodie. They are followed by a variety of commemoratives honoring notable figures, up to a last airmail issue June 13, 1949, which was issued in only small numbers due to the growing rebellion.

A number of the 1940s issues were later overprinted and used by the Viet Minh

See also
Postage stamps of the French Colonies
Postage stamps and postal history of Annam and Tongking
Postage stamps and postal history of Vietnam
Postage stamps and postal history of Cambodia
Postage stamps and postal history of Laos

Sources 
 Stanley Gibbons Ltd: various catalogues
 Encyclopaedia of Postal Authorities
Rossiter, Stuart & John Flower. The Stamp Atlas. London: Macdonald, 1986.

References

Further reading
 Berbain, A. Note sur le service postal, télégraphique et télephonique de l'Indochine. Hanoi-Haiphong: Imp. d'Extrême-Orient, 1923 25p.
 Despierres, René. PTT service in Indochina: from its origins until 1940; translated into english by Marie-Hélène Arnauld. Arlington: Society of Indo-China Philatelists, 2015 45p.
 Desrousseaux, Jacques. Les Cachets civils de L'Indochine française, les postes françaises en Extrême-Orient. Paris: The Author, 1971 80p.
 Grabowski, Edward J. J. Indochina and French offices in China: use and nonuse of the French colonial allegorical group type & Indochina military mail between 1893 and 1905. 2008, 75p.
 Lemerle, Laurent. La France d'outre-mer par ses timbres: Tome III, Indochine, Océanie. Paris: Éd. Timbropresse, 2005  158p.

External links
 The Society of Indo-China Philatelists

Philately of Vietnam